Ranson's Folly is a 1926 American silent Western film produced by and starring Richard Barthelmess and co-starring Dorothy Mackaill. It is based on a Richard Harding Davis novel and 1904 play, Ranson's Folly, and was filmed previously in 1910 and in 1915 by Edison.

Cast
 Richard Barthelmess - Lt. Ranson
 Dorothy Mackaill - Mary Cahill
 Anders Randolf - The Post Trader
 Pat Hartigan - Sgt. Clancy
 William Bailey - Lt. Crosby (* William Norton Bailey)
 Brooks Benedict - Lt. Curtis
 C. C. Smith - Col. Bolland (as C.C. Smith USA)
 Pauline Neff - Mrs. Bolland
 Billie Bennett - Mrs. Truesdale
 Frank Coffyn - Post Adjutant
 Hans Joby - Judge Advocate (* as Capt. John S. Peters USN)
 Taylor N. Duncan - Capt. Carr (* as Taylor Duncan)
 J. C. Fowler - Col. Patten (as Jack Fowler)
 Edward W. Bowman - Pop Henderson (as E. W. Borman)
 Bud Pope - Abe Fisher
 Forrest Seabury - Drummer
 Chief Eagle Wing - Indian Pete
 Chief John Big Tree - Chief Standing Bear

References

External links
 Ranson's Folly at IMDb.com
 allmovie/synopsis; Ranson's Folly
 Ranson's Folly available on DVD
 Ranson's Folly to watch on YouTube
   Ranson's Folly at website dedicated to Sidney Olcott

1926 films
1926 Western (genre) films
Films directed by Sidney Olcott
American black-and-white films
Films based on American novels
First National Pictures films
Remakes of American films
Silent American Western (genre) films
1920s American films
1920s English-language films